Elias B. Tolentino Jr. (November 5, 1942 – November 19, 2017) was a Filipino basketball player who competed in the 1968 Summer Olympics.

Playing career
Elias was a five-time national player and one of the major faces in Philippine basketball in the 1960s and early 1970s. Tolentino played with champion teams in his junior to senior years. He was a proud player of the Jose Rizal College junior squad from 1958-1959 that took the NCAA juniors basketball crown. He went on to try his mettle with the JRC Heavy Bombers in 1960 where his team lost to Freddie Webb and the Letran Knights for the NCAA seniors title in 1960.

Tolentino played for Crispa Redmanizers in the MICAA for the 1961-62 season as Crispa won a title in 1962. From 1963 to 1974, he figured in another champion squad - the YCO Painters. His first and most illustrious stint with the Philippine National team was in 1963. The RP squad came home triumphant in defending its ABC crown in Taipei. He was also a member of the Philippine team that played in Yokohama, Japan for the 1964 Tokyo Olympic Games qualifying tournament. He was again a member of the 1968 Mexico Olympic squad of the country and the Bangkok ABC in 1969. Tolentino's fifth and last stint with the national team was in the 1970 Asian Invitational basketball conference in Manila.

The ex-Olympian would play in the Philippine Basketball Association for Toyota in 1976 and Seven-Up in 1977.

Death
He died on November 19, 2017.

References

External links
 

1942 births
2017 deaths
Olympic basketball players of the Philippines
Basketball players at the 1968 Summer Olympics
Philippines men's national basketball team players
Filipino men's basketball players
JRU Heavy Bombers basketball players
People from Makati
Basketball players from Metro Manila
Place of death missing